The discography of American-born Australian actress and producer Nicole Kidman consists of one spoken word album, one extended play, four singles, and a number of unreleased tracks and other appearances.

Kidman, who is primarily known for her acting career, entered the music industry in the early 2000s after recording a number of tracks for the soundtrack album to Baz Luhrmann's 2001 motion picture Moulin Rouge! in which she starred. Her duet with Ewan McGregor entitled "Come What May" was released as her debut and the second single of the OST through Interscope on 24 September 2001. The composition became the eighth highest selling single by an Australian artist for that year, being certified Gold by Australian Recording Industry Association, while reaching on the UK Singles Chart at number twenty-seven. In addition to, the song received a nomination at the 59th Golden Globe Awards as the Best Original Song and has been listed as the eighty-fifth within AFI's 100 Years...100 Songs by American Film Institute.

"Somethin' Stupid", a cover version of the Frank and Nancy Sinatra song followed soon. The track recorded as her common duet with English singer-songwriter Robbie Williams was issued on 14 December 2001 by Chrysalis as the lead of his fourth studio album Swing When You're Winning. Kidman's second single topped the official music charts in Italy, New Zealand, Portugal and the UK, as well as scored top ten placings all over Europe, including Australia, Austria, Belgium, Denmark, Germany, Netherlands, Norway and Switzerland. Apart from being certified either Gold in a number of countries, it was classified as the eleventh best selling single of 2002 in Italy, thirtieth in the UK, the fifty-ninth in Australia, and the ninety-third in France, respectively. 
On 5 April 2002, Kidman released, through Interscope, her third single, a cover of Randy Crawford's "One Day I'll Fly Away". A Tony Philips remix of the track was promoted as the pilot single of a follow-up to the original soundtrack of the same name, Moulin Rouge! Vol. 2. After that, in 2006, she contributed with her vocal for the OST of Happy Feet on a rendition of Prince's "Kiss". While in 2009, she was featured on the Nine soundtrack ("Unusual Way").

Most recently, her name has been credited on a track called "What's the Procedure", issued on 14 March 2013 on the compilation I Know Why They Call It Pop: Volume 2 by Rok Lok Records. Among others, Kidman also narrated an audiobook in 2012.

Albums

Spoken word albums

Extended plays

Singles

Other appearances

Unreleased tracks

Music videos

See also 

 AFI's 100 Years...100 Songs
 List of performers on Top of the Pops
 Golden Globe Award for Best Original Song

References

External links 
 
 Nicole Kidman at AllMusic
 
 
 

Discographies of Australian artists
Pop music discographies
Discography